Zeke is a masculine given name and nickname, sometimes a shortened form (hypocorism) of Ezekiel, which may refer to:

People
Isiah Thomas, Basketball Hall of Fame point guard.
Caleb Bailey (nickname "Zeke", 1898-1957), US Marine Corps brigadier general and athlete
Zeke Bella (1930–2013), American baseball player
Zeke Bonura (1908–1987), American baseball player
Zeke Bratkowski (1931–2019), American football player
Zeke Clements (1911–1994), American country musician
Zeke Dombrowski (born 1986), American soccer player 
Ezekiel Elliott (born 1995), American football running back
Ezekiel Emanuel (born 1957), American oncologist, bioethicist and professor
Zeke Jabbour, American professional bridge player
Zeke Jones (born 1966), American wrestler
Zeke Manners (1911–2000), American country musician
Zeke Manyika (born 1955), Zimbabwean-born British musician
Zeke Meyer (1892–1962), American racecar driver
Zeke Moore (born 1943), American football player 
Zeke Moreno (born 1978), American football player
Zeke Mowatt (born 1961), American football player
Zeke Nnaji (born 2001), American basketball player
Alden Sanborn (nickname "Zeke", 1899–1991), American rower
Zeke Smith (1936–2016), American football player
Zeke Steggall (born 1971), Australian snowboarder
Zeke Turner (born 1996), American football player
Zeke Upshaw (1991–2018), American basketball player
Zeke Wilson (1869–1928), American baseball player
Zeke Wissinger (1902–1963), American football player
Zeke Wrigley (1874–1952), American baseball player
Zeke Zarchy (1915–2009), American trumpet player
Zeke Zawoluk (1930–2007), American basketball player
Zeke Zekley (1915–2005), American cartoonist
Zeke Zettner (1948–1973), American musician

Fictional characters

In film
List of characters from High School Musical (film series)#Zeke Baylor, a fictional character in the High School Musical film series
Zeke Tyler, in the 1998 film The Faculty
Zeke, in The Wizard of Oz (1939 film), portrayed by Bert Lahr
List of characters in the Ice Age films#Zeke, a character in the 2002 film Ice Age
Zeke Finklestein, in the 2009 film The Rebound
Zeke, military slang for zombies in World War Z (film)
Zeke Hawkins, in the 1993 film Sliver

On television
Zeke Kinski, in the Australian soap opera Neighbours
Ezekiel "Zeke" Stone, protagonist of the short-lived series Brimstone (TV series)
Zeke, a nickname for Philip Banks in List of The Fresh Prince of Bel-Air characters
Zeke, nickname of the character Tom (Lost) in Lost
Zeke, in the animated series Bob's Burgers
Zeke, Sid's baby brother from the animated series Sid the Science Kid
Zeke Abramowitz, a character in the American web series Zombie College
Zeke Braverman, the patriarch in the show Parenthood

Comics, manga, and novels 
 Zeke Midas Wolf or Big Bad Wolf in Disney comics
 Zeke Asakura, English name for Hao Asakura, in the anime and manga series Shaman King
 Zeke Brenner, in the comic strip Doonesbury
 Zeke Yeager, in the anime and manga Attack on Titan (Shingeki no Kyojin)
 Zeke Stane, a Marvel Comics villain
 Zeke or Gustaf Zuckermandel, Jr., in the Left Behind novels by Tim LaHaye and Jerry Jenkins
 Zeke a novel about a Navy Seal by Dr. HB Paksoy (9798675061082)

In video games 
 Ozychlyrus Brounev Tantal, better known as Zeke von Genbu, a character from Xenoblade Chronicles 2

Other 
 Zeke, the artificial intelligence in development by Hub Culture
 Zeke, reporting name of Mitsubishi A6M Zero fighter
 Zero electron kinetic energy (ZEKE) spectroscopy

References

Masculine given names
Lists of people by nickname
Hypocorisms
English masculine given names